Vladimir "Geza" Šenauer (Schönauer) (29 November 1930 – 5 January 2013) was a Croatian professional footballer.

Early life and family
Šenauer was born in Split, Littoral Banovina, to Geza Schönauer, Jewish leather merchant from Daruvar, and Zorka (née Rakelić), Split born Catholic. He was raised Jewish by his family. His father owned the boutique and newsstand in Split. During World War II, officer of the Italian army protected the Schönauer family from persecutions. In 1943, he advised them to leave Split before the arrival of Nazis and Ustaše. In September 1943, the Independent State of Croatia took over the Split from the Italian fascists, so Šenauer and his family escaped to hide on the island of Vis. Soon after they escaped to Bari, Italy. Šenauer's paternal grandmother, most of his closer and wider family were killed during the Holocaust. Šenauer returned to Split in 1947, few days before his father.

Football career
He spend most of his career playing for his hometown club HNK Hajduk Split winning with them 3 national championships. He also won one national cup in the period in between while he was playing with OFK Belgrade, curiously winning in the final against his former club, Hajduk. Before ending his career he also had a spell abroad with SK Austria Klagenfurt, before returning to finish his career playing with RNK Split. He was known for his speed and excellent execution of free kicks. After retiring he was an active member in the direction board of Hajduk, and between 1979 and 1990 he was the director of the Hajduk stadium, Poljud.

He made two appearances for the Yugoslav B national team, both in 1951, first in Tunis, on 14 October, against Tunisia (7–3 win with Šenauer scoring the lat goal), and second in Sfax, on 16 October, against South Tunisia (5–0 win).

Death
Šenauer died on 5 January 2013 in Split, and was buried at the Lovrinac Cemetery.

References

External links
 Career story at Nogometni Leksikon.

1930 births
2013 deaths
Footballers from Split, Croatia
Croatian Jews
Association football wingers
Yugoslav footballers
HNK Hajduk Split players
OFK Beograd players
FC Kärnten players
RNK Split players
Yugoslav First League players
Austrian Football Bundesliga players
Yugoslav expatriate footballers
Expatriate footballers in Austria
Yugoslav expatriate sportspeople in Austria
Burials at Lovrinac Cemetery